Zita Sabah Okaikoi is a Ghanaian politician and diplomat who served as the Minister for Tourism of Ghana and later Ghana's Ambassador to the Czech Republic.

Education
Okaikoi is a graduate of the Kwame Nkrumah University of Science and Technology and the Ghana School of Law.

Politics
Okaikoi was the first Minister for Information in the National Democratic Congress government of President John Atta Mills. She held that portfolio through the first year of the Mills government. Okaikoi was appointed Minister for Tourism by President Mills in a cabinet reshuffle in January 2010. She attracted controversy in 2010 when she left for the United States during her pregnancy ostensibly to have a baby.

Personal life 
She is the daughter of a Lebanese-Ghanaian father and a Ghanaian mother.

Zita dumped her ex-husband after a failed marriage to Mr. Andrew Okaikoi. She remarried in a private wedding ceremony.

See also
List of Mills government ministers
National Democratic Congress (Ghana)

References

External links and sources
Zita Okaikoi on Ghana Government website
Facebook page

Living people
Year of birth missing (living people)
Information ministers of Ghana
Tourism ministers of Ghana
University of Ghana alumni
Ghanaian women lawyers
Kwame Nkrumah University of Science and Technology alumni
National Democratic Congress (Ghana) politicians
Ghanaian women ambassadors
Ambassadors of Ghana to Czech Republic
Archbishop Porter Girls' Senior High School alumni
21st-century Ghanaian lawyers